Shoichet is a surname. Notable people with the surname include:

Molly Shoichet, Canadian chemist who was the Province of Ontario's First Chief Scientist
Rebecca Shoichet (born 1975), Canadian voice actress and singer